James Parkes (born 30 November 1980 in Chelmsford, Essex, England) is a former English professional Rugby union football player for Leeds Tykes. His usual position is at hooker. He retired then in 2007. But in November 2010 he was brought out of retirement to  be on the bench to play Sale Sharks after an injury to Andy Titterrell. He formerly played for Gloucester Rugby and Saracens F.C.

References

External links
 Premiership rugby profile

1980 births
Living people
English rugby union players
Gloucester Rugby players
Leeds Tykes players
Rugby union players from Chelmsford
Saracens F.C. players
Rugby union hookers